Emmaus (Greek: Ἐμμαούς, Emmaous; ; , Emmaom; , ʻImwas) is a town mentioned in the Gospel of Luke of the New Testament. Luke reports that Jesus appeared, after his death and resurrection, before two of his disciples while they were walking on the road to Emmaus.

Although its geographical identification is not certain, several locations have been suggested throughout history, chiefly Emmaus Nicopolis.  It is known only that it was connected by a road to Jerusalem; the distance given by Luke varies in different manuscripts and the figure given has been made even more ambiguous by interpretations.

Name
The place-name Emmaus is relatively common in classical sources about the Levant and is usually derived through Greek and Latin from the Semitic word for "warm spring", the Hebrew form of which is hamma or hammat (חמת). In the ancient and present-day Middle East, many sites are named Hama Hamath and variations thereof.

The name for Emmaus was hellenized during the 2nd century BC and appears in Jewish and Greek texts in many variations: Ammaus, Ammaum, Emmaus, Emmaum, Maus, Amus, etc.: , 

Emmaus may derive from the Hebrew ḥammat meaning "hot spring", and is generally referred to in Hebrew sources as Ḥamtah or Ḥamtān. A spring of Emmaus, or alternatively a 'spring of salvation' is attested in Greek sources. Emmaus is mentioned by this name in Midrash Zutta for Song of Songs 6,8 and Midrash Rabba for Lamentations 1,45, and in the Midrash Rabba on Ecclesiastes (7:15).

Emmaus in the New Testament

Emmaus is mentioned in the Gospel of Luke as the village where Jesus appeared to his disciples after his crucifixion and resurrection.  indicates that Jesus appears after his resurrection to two disciples who are walking from Jerusalem to Emmaus, which is described as being 60 stadia (10.4 to 12 km depending on what definition of stadion is used) from Jerusalem. One of the disciples is named Cleopas (verse 18), while his companion remains unnamed:
That very day two of them were going to a village (one hundred and) sixty stadia away from Jerusalem called Emmaus, and they were speaking about all the things that had occurred. And it happened that while they were speaking and debating, Jesus himself drew near and walked with them, but their eyes were prevented from recognizing him … As they approached the village to which they were going, he gave the impression that he was going on further. But they urged him, "Stay with us, for it is nearly evening and the day is declining." So he went in to stay with them. And it happened that, while he was with them at table, he took bread, said the blessing, broke it, and gave it to them. With that their eyes were opened and they recognized him.

According to the gospel, the story takes place in the evening of the day of Jesus's resurrection. The two disciples hear that the tomb of Jesus was found empty earlier that day. They are discussing the events of the past few days when a stranger asks them what they are discussing. "Their eyes were kept from recognizing him." He rebukes them for their unbelief and explains prophecies about the Messiah to them. On reaching Emmaus, they ask the stranger to join them for the evening meal.

When he breaks the bread, "their eyes [are] opened" and they recognize him as the resurrected Christ. Jesus immediately vanishes. Cleopas and his friend then hasten back to Jerusalem to carry the news to the other disciples.

A similar event is mentioned in the Gospel of Mark, although the disciples' destination is not stated. This passage is believed by some to be a late addition, derived from the Gospel of Luke.

The incident is not mentioned in the Gospels of Matthew or John.

Possible locations
Emmaus is the Greek variant of the Hebrew word and place-name for hot springs, hammat,  and is therefore not unique to one location, which makes the identification of the New Testament site more difficult.

Several places in Judea and Galilee are called Emmaus in the Bible, the works of Josephus Flavius, and other sources from the relevant period. The one most often mentioned is a town of some importance situated in the Valley of Ajalon (today, Ayyalon), later called Emmaus Nicopolis.

Historical identification

Many sites have been suggested for the biblical Emmaus, among them Emmaus Nicopolis (c. 160 stadia from Jerusalem), Kiryat Anavim (66 stadia from Jerusalem on the carriage road to Jaffa), Coloniya (c. 36 stadia on the carriage road to Jaffa), el-Kubeibeh (63 stadia, on the Roman road to Lydda), Artas (60 stadia from Jerusalem) and Khurbet al-Khamasa (86 stadia on the Roman road to Eleutheropolis). The oldest identification that is currently known is Emmaus Nicopolis.  The identification is complicated by the fact that New Testament manuscripts list at least three different distances between Jerusalem and Emmaus in Luke 24:13-14.

Emmaus-Nicopolis/Imwas 

The first modern site identification of Emmaus was by the explorer Edward Robinson, who equated it with the Palestinian Arab village of Imwas, near the Latrun monastery. Before its destruction in 1967, the village of Imwas was located at the end of the Ayalon Valley, on the border of the hill country of Judah, at 153 stadia (18.6 miles) from Jerusalem via the Kiryat Yearim Ridge Route, 161 stadia (19.6 miles) via the Beth-Horon Ridge Route and  lower by elevation.

Eusebius was probably the first to mention Nicopolis as biblical Emmaus in his Onomasticon. Jerome, who translated Eusebius' book, implied in his letter 108 that there was a church in Nicopolis built in the house of Cleopas where Jesus broke bread on that late journey. From the 4th century on, the site was commonly identified as the biblical Emmaus.

Archaeologically, many remains have been excavated at the site of the former Palestinian village, now located inside Canada Park, which support historical and traditional claims. Five structures were found and dated, including a Christian basilica from the 6th century and a 12th-century Crusader church. Emmaus Nicopolis is a titular see of the Roman Catholic Church.

There are several sources giving information about this town's ancient history, among them the First Book of Maccabees, the works of Josephus, and chronicles from the Late Roman, Byzantine and Early Muslim periods. According to 1 Maccabees 3:55-4:22, around 166 BC Judas Maccabeus fought against the Seleucids in the region of this particular Emmaus, and was victorious at the Battle of Emmaus; later, this town was fortified by Bacchides, a Seleucid general (1 Macc 9:50). When Rome took over the land it became the capital of a district or toparchy, and was burnt by order of Varus after the death of Herod in 4 BC. During the First Jewish Revolt, before the siege of Jerusalem, Vespasian's 5th legion was deployed there while the 10th Legion was in Jericho. The town was renamed Emmaus Nicopolis in AD 221 by Emperor Elagabalus, who conferred it the title of polis ("city") following the request of a delegation from Emmaus. The Plague of Emmaus in AD 639, mentioned in Muslim sources, is claimed to have caused up to 25,000 deaths in the town.

Al-Qubeiba/Castellum Emmaus/Chubebe/Qubaibat
Another possibility is the village of al-Qubeiba, west of Nabi Samwil on the Beit Horon road northwest of Jerusalem. The town, meaning "little domes" in Arabic, is located at about 65 stadia from Jerusalem. A Roman fort subsequently named Castellum Emmaus (from the Latin root castra, meaning encampment) was discovered at the site in 1099 by the Crusaders. However, there is no source from the Roman, Byzantine or Early Muslim periods naming it as "Emmaus" for the time of Jesus. Whether Josephus (who puts Emmaus at a distance of thirty stadia from Jerusalem) was referring to this place is now uncertain. However, the Gospel of Luke speaks of 60 stadia (Luke 24:13), a distance very close to the actual 65 stadia to Qubeibeh.

In the 12th century, the Crusaders of the Kingdom of Jerusalem called the site "Small Mahomeria", in order to distinguish it from the "Large Mahomeria" near Ramallah. Sounding similar to "Mahommed", the term was used in medieval times to describe a place inhabited or used for prayer by Muslims. It was referred to as Qubaibat for the first time at the end of that same century by the writer Abu Shama, who writes in his Book of the Two Gardens about a Muslim prince falling into the hands of the Crusaders at this spot. The Franciscans built a church here in 1902, on the ruins of a Crusader basilica.

During the Second World War, British authorities held Franciscans of Italian and German nationality at Emmaus-Qubeibeh. While there,
Bellarmino Bagatti conducted excavations from 1940 to 1944 which revealed artifacts from the Hellenistic, Roman, Byzantine, and Crusader periods. Inspired by Bagatti's work, Virgilio Canio Corbo also undertook some experimental explorations.

Abu-Ghosh/Kiryat Anavim

Abu Ghosh is located in the middle of the Kiryat Yearim Ridge Route between Nicopolis and Jerusalem, nine miles (83 stadia) from the capital. A former Minorite convent with a Gothic church was turned into a stable. Robinson dated it to the Crusader period and declared it "more perfectly preserved than any other ancient church in Palestine." Excavations carried out in 1944 supported the identification with Fontenoid, a site the Crusaders held for a while to be Emmaus before accepting Nicopolis as the "real" Emmaus.

Emmaus/Colonia/Motza/Ammassa/Ammaous/Khirbet Mizza
Colonia, between Abu Ghosh and Jerusalem on the Kiryat Yearim Ridge Route, is another possibility. At a distance of c. 8 km from Jerusalem, it was referred to as Mozah in the Old Testament. Motza was identified as the Emmaus of Luke in 1881 by William F. Birch (1840–1916) of the Palestine Exploration Fund, and again in 1893 by Paulo Savi. One mile to the north of modern Motza is a ruin called Khirbet Beit Mizza, which was identified by some scholars as the biblical Mozah, until recent excavations placed Mozah at Khirbet Mizza (without "Beit"), as the ruins of Qalunya/Colonia are called in Arabic.

Excavations in 2001-2003 headed by Professor Carsten Peter Thiede were cut short by his sudden death in 2004. Thiede was a strong proponent of Motza as the real Emmaus. He offered that the Latin Amassa and the Greek Ammaous are derived from the biblical Hebrew name Motza: Motza – ha-Motza ("ha" is the Hebrew equivalent of the definite article "the") – ha-Mosa – Amosa – Amaous – Emmaus. His excavation summaries were removed from the website of the Basel college he was teaching at, but a book and at least one article he published on the topic are available. He contended that neither Nicopolis, Abu Ghosh, or Al-Qubeiba can be considered because the first was located too far from Jerusalem, while the two others were not called Emmaus at the time of Jesus.

Josephus Flavius writes in Antiquities of the Jews about a city called Emmaus in the context of the Maccabean Revolt, which corresponds well with the large city later called Emmaus Nicopolis, located at over 170 Roman stadia from Jerusalem, while in The Jewish War he brings up another Emmaus, just 30 Roman stadia from Jerusalem, where Vespasian settled 800 Roman legionnaires after the First Jewish Revolt. The ancient Latin manuscripts use "Amassa", while the medieval Greek manuscripts use "Ammaous". The newly created Roman "colonia" soon made the old name disappear: even the Jewish works of the 3rd-5th centuries, the Mishnah, the Babylonian and the Jerusalem Talmud, talk about "Qeloniya", an Aramaic distortion of "colonia". This name survived into modern times in Arabic as "Qalunya". This was indeed always a village, not a city like Emmaus Nicopolis, and thus fits the description by Luke (κωμη "village") much better than the latter. The difference in distance to Jerusalem between Luke's and Josephus' Emmaus, 60 vs. 30 stadia, is still much smaller than the one to Nicopolis, which lays fully 176 stadia down the Roman road from Jerusalem. Thiede recalculated the actual distance between Jerusalem's western city gate at the time, and his excavation site at Motza which unearthed the Jewish village that predated the Roman veterans colony, and came up with a figure of 46 stadia. That would put it squarely in the middle between Luke's and Josephus' stated distances, which Thiede considers a good approximation for the time. Thiede's excavation produced Jewish artifacts of the time preceding the fall of Jerusalem in 70 CE, giving substance to his claim to have found Luke's Emmaus, which had necessarily to be settled by Jews. With no other Emmaus in the vicinity of Jerusalem, Motza was thus the only credible candidate.

Possible symbolic identification
One of the oldest extant versions of the Gospel of Luke, preserved in the Codex Bezae, reads "Oulammaus" instead of Emmaus. In Septuagint, the Greek translation of the Old Testament scriptures, Oulammaus was the place where Jacob was visited by God in his dream, while sleeping on a rock. However, Oulammaus was not a real place name but a translation mistake. The original name in Hebrew was "Luz". This mistake was later corrected, but was still there at the time when the Gospel was written around AD 100. Thus, a theory has been put forward, that the story in the Gospel was merely symbolic, drawing a parallel between Jacob being visited by God and the disciples being visited by Jesus.

Richard Carrier (a prominent Jesus "Mythicist"), in his book On the Historicity of Jesus, cites this story as one of two examples of the "Vanishing Hitchhiker" urban legend from antiquity, the other being a legend concerning Romulus, the mythical founder of Rome.  The story, found in Livy and Plutarch, tells of Proculus (meaning "Proclaimer" in archaic Latin) journeying by road from Alba Longa to Rome and meeting a stranger who is the resurrected Romulus. Rome is in turmoil because Romulus was recently killed and his body vanished.  On their journey, Romulus explains the secrets of the kingdom, in other words how to conquer and rule the world, before ascending into heaven. Proculus then recognises the stranger and goes on to proclaim what he was told. The story recounted in Luke's gospel (Luke 24) parallels the earlier Roman myth: Cleopas (meaning "glory of her father" in Greek), while traveling by road from Jerusalem to Emmaus after learning of the death of Jesus, meets Jesus in disguise. As they walk and eat together, Jesus explains the secrets of the kingdom of heaven. Jesus later vanishes and Cleopas, now realizing who the stranger was, goes on to proclaim what he was told.

Contemporary use
Emmaus, Pennsylvania, a township in the Lehigh Valley region of the United States, draws its name from the Biblical references to Emmaus.

Notable residents
Rabbi Akiva

References

New Testament cities
Ancient Jewish settlements of Judaea